Leave 'Em Laughing is a 1928 two-reel silent film starring Stan Laurel and Oliver Hardy. Produced by the Hal Roach Studios, it was shot in October 1927 and released January 28, 1928 by Metro-Goldwyn-Mayer.

Opening title 
What's worse than an aching tooth at three in the morning? -- Two of them --

Plot 
The scene opens in the duo's flat at night time. Stan complains that he has a toothache. Ollie goes to the bathroom to get him a hot-water bottle and keeps stepping on a tack which is lying around. When Stan gets the water bottle, the lid opens and the water pours out in the bed. The two of them make much noise and the landlord (Charlie Hall) comes in, telling them that they will have to leave first thing in the morning.
The two get into a physical fight with the landlord, ending in him seemingly falling down the stairs.

The next day, Stan is in the dentist office, but is too afraid to get his tooth pulled. The dentist leaves and Ollie demonstrates how Stan should sit and not be afraid. Meanwhile, the dentist tells one of his partners that he should go to the guy who is sitting in the chair and pull his tooth out. He ended up pulling Ollie's tooth. When Stan is back in the chair, Ollie puts the mask over Stan and makes him unconscious. During the struggle enough gas is released to make Ollie unconscious also. Some staff are also affected.

Stan and Ollie leave the office and go to their car, still laughing their heads off from the gas.

There follows a protracted sequence where their drugged driving causes mayhem at an intersection, involving a traffic police officer who they fight with, and who tries to drive them to jail but drives poorly, eventually sinking the car into an open sewer.

Cast

Production notes
Leave 'Em Laughing marks the first appearance of Edgar Kennedy in a Laurel and Hardy film.

Chapters of The Sons of the Desert (the international Laurel and Hardy Appreciation Society) take their names from the duo's films. Leave 'Em Laughing chapters are currently located in Bridgeport, Connecticut, the Twin Cities, Minnesota and Jacksonville, Florida.

Leave 'Em Laughing was remade by The Three Stooges in 1943 as I Can Hardly Wait.

References

External links 

1928 films
1928 comedy films
American silent short films
American black-and-white films
Laurel and Hardy (film series)
Metro-Goldwyn-Mayer short films
1928 short films
American comedy short films
Films directed by Clyde Bruckman
1920s American films
Silent American comedy films